Rognan Airport is a private airport situated in the village of Rognan in the municipality of Saltdal in Nordland county, Norway. The municipal airport features a  grass runway aligned 01/19. It is used for recreational flying and is operated by Saltdal Flyklubb.

The airport was built by Luftwaffe during the Second World War. Construction began in 1941 and the airport opened the following year, featuring a  wood and concrete runway. It served mostly as a reserve airport for Bodø Air Station. Rognan Airport was abandoned as a military airbase after the end of the war.

History
An airport in Rognan was first considered by the Royal Air Force during the Norwegian Campaign in May 1940, although the plans were never carried through. Instead, construction was carried out by Luftwaffe. Preliminary work started in late 1941 and the airport was completed the following year. The Luftwaffe used the airport little, and it was mostly retained as a reserve airport for Bodø Air Station. For a period a squadron of Junkers Ju 52 transporters were stationed at Rognan.

After the war the airport was taken over by the municipality and has been used for general aviation. A contributing factor has been the high load on Bodø Airport, which has caused restrictions on use by recreational aircraft. Especially sailplane activities were allocated to Rognan. Saltdal Flyklubb was established as a local aviation club in 1993. It took over the responsibility for operating the airport, although it remained owned by the municipality.

Facilities

Rognan Airport is located in the village of Rognan, west of population center. It is situated north and west of the river Saltelva and the Nordland Line. It is aligned 01/19, roughly north–south. The airport is owned by Saltdal Municipality and operated by Saltdal Flyklubb, the sole regular operator at the field.

The offices, barracks and communications center was located in the village, southwest of the runway. There were two 20 mm gun positions in Rognan to protect the airport. Organizationally Rognan Airport was subordinate Bodø Air Station.

References

Bibliography
 

Airports in Nordland
Airports in the Arctic
Luftwaffe airports in Norway
Saltdal
1942 establishments in Norway
Airports established in 1942
Military installations in Nordland